Neoheppia is a genus of fungi within the Peltulaceae family. Circumscribed by botanist Alexander Zahlbruckner in 1909, it is a monotypic genus, containing only the species Neoheppia brasiliensis.

References

External links
Index Fungorum

Lichinomycetes
Lichen genera
Taxa named by Alexander Zahlbruckner
Taxa described in 1909